The Koenigsberger ratio is the proportion of remanent magnetization relative to induced magnetization in natural rocks. It is a dimensionless parameter often used in geophysical exploration to describe the magnetic characteristics of a geological body for help in interpreting magnetic anomaly patterns.

The total magnetization of a rock is the sum of its natural remanent magnetization and the magnetization induced by the ambient geomagnetic field. Thus, a Koenigsberger ratio, Q, greater than 1 indicates that the remanence properties contribute the majority of the total magnetization of the rock.

References

Ratios
Rock magnetism
Paleomagnetism
Geomagnetism
Magnetic ordering